Falls Lake is a 12,410 acre (50 km²) reservoir located in Durham, Wake, and Granville counties in North Carolina, United States. Falls Lake extends  up the Neuse River to its source at the confluence of the Eno, Little, and Flat rivers.

The lake is named for the Falls of the Neuse, a once whitewater section of the river that fell from the Piedmont into the lower Coastal Plain submerged during construction of the lake.

The lake provides drinking water for several of the surrounding communities, including the city of Raleigh, aids with flood control and serves as a recreation area and wildlife habitat.

Work on the dam that holds the lake began in 1978 and was completed in 1981. Prior to its construction flooding of the Neuse River caused extensive damage to public and private properties including roadways, railroads, industrial sites and farmlands. The U.S. Army Corps of Engineers constructed and manages the dam.

See also
Falls Lake State Recreation Area

External links
 Falls Lake State Recreation Area 
 Falls Lake water level plot (1983-present)
 

 

Reservoirs in North Carolina
Protected areas of Durham County, North Carolina
Protected areas of Wake County, North Carolina
Protected areas of Granville County, North Carolina
Dams in North Carolina
United States Army Corps of Engineers dams
Landforms of Durham County, North Carolina
Landforms of Wake County, North Carolina
Landforms of Granville County, North Carolina
1981 establishments in North Carolina
Dams completed in 1981